is a 1968 Japanese comic science fiction film directed by Takeshi 'Ken' Matsumori from a screenplay by Yasuo Tanami.  It is about a cult around an anthropomorphic frog called Gamara (Hideo Naka), probably named in parody of Daiei Motion Picture Company's semi-anthropomorphic turtle, Gamera.

The film also stars Akira Takarada, Akemi Kita, Kei Tani, Akihiko Hirata, Yû Fujiki, and Wakako Sakai, with a cameo by Jun Tazaki.

Plot 
A timid office worker Keitarô Tamaru loves studying fantasy and myths. Even if Tamaru make an outstanding performance in his fantasy and connect with a wonderful woman, in reality he will only fail. As a result, he was finally downgraded from his employee job and decided to signed up as a security guard. One night, Tamaru and Chief Guard Yamamura were attacked by a mysterious group that has invaded the company, and Yamamura is seriously injured and hospitalized. However, Tamaru meet a wonderful woman who always appears in his fantasy dream. Her name was Hiroko Yamamura, the daughter of Yamamura. Tamaru rejoices, but after a short while, he is suspected by the police to be a member of a group that has invaded the company and is arrested. Tamaru escapes from the detention center and stands up to save Hiroko, who was kidnapped by the group.

Cast 

 Kei Tani as Keitarō Tamaru / Voice of Gamara
 Wakako Sakai as Hiroko Yamamura
 Akira Takarada as Takashi Maeno
 Hajime Hana as Detective A
 Senri Sakurai as Detective B
 Hideo Naka as Gamara (stunt performer)
 Akemi Kita as Kondô's Secretary Michiko Akiyama
 Masako Kyozuka as Hisako Tamaru (Mother of Keitarō)
 Makoto Fujita as Sansui Construction Company's President
 Takuya Fujioka as Design Director Kondô
 Yû Fujiki as Kuroda
 Yukihiko Gondo, Hiroshi Tanaka, Hiroto Kimura as Kuroda's subordinates
 Akihiko Hirata as Industrial espionage boss
 Yasuo Araki, Ken Echigo, Hans Horneff as Industrial spies
 Yutaka Sada as Chief Guard Yamamura (Father of Hiroko)
 Masao Komatsu as Jailer
 Yutaka Nakayama as Policeman
 Hiroshi Sekita as Kendo Hall Man
 Takao Zushi as Marathon player
 Keiji Yanoma as Western Clothes Store clerk
 Keiko Nishioka, Rie Nakagawa, Yoko Yano as Geishas
 Ikio Sawamura as Driver
 Wakako Tanabe as Hospital nurse
 Hideo Naka and Ultra Three as Thieves
 Saburō Iketani as Radio announcer on the radio (non-credited)
 Midori Uchiyama as Woman at the store (non-credited)
 Rinsaku Ogata, Keiichiro Katsumoto, Yoshie Kihira, Akira Kitchoji as Soccer field spectators (non-credited)

External links
 

1968 films
Japanese science fiction comedy films
1960s Japanese-language films
1960s science fiction films
1960s fantasy films
1960s Japanese films